The Special Educational Needs (Information) Act 2008 (c 11) is an Act of the Parliament of the United Kingdom. The Bill had cross-party support. It was supported by charities across the education sector.

Section 1 - Information about children with special educational needs
This section inserted sections 332C to E, and preceding cross-heading, into the Education Act 1996. It came into force on 1 January.

Section 2 - Short title, commencement and extent
This section came into force on 21 July 2008.

References
Halsbury's Statutes,

External links
The Special Educational Needs (Information) Act 2008, as amended from the National Archives.
The Special Educational Needs (Information) Act 2008, as originally enacted from the National Archives.

United Kingdom Acts of Parliament 2008